Duomo is an interchange station serving Lines 1 and 3 of the Milan Metro.

The station is underground and located at Piazza Duomo, the central area of Milan. The Line 1 station was opened on 1 November 1964 as part of the inaugural section of the Metro, between Sesto Marelli and Lotto. On 1 May 1990, it became an interchange with Line 3. Initially, Duomo was connected with Centrale by shuttle service, and on 16 December 1990, with the extension of the line from Duomo to Porta Romana, full-scale service started.

The Line 3 platform serving trains to San Donato has several problems with moisture as it is at a depth of about 25 meters. Line 1, being older, runs above Line 3. The Line 3 section is divided into two orthogonal tubes, the northern one being above the southern one.

Near the station are the Duomo, the Teatro alla Scala, the Royal Palace and the Galleria Vittorio Emanuele II.

A corridor of the station is in communication (but the passage is closed) with the archaeological excavations of the pre-Christian basilica located under the Duomo.

The mezzanine of the station is connected by tunnels that reach the exits of Piazza Cordusio ("Craft Gallery"), Palazzo Reale ("Galleria del Parvis"), Corso Vittorio Emanuele II and the Rinascente in Piazza Duomo.

References

External links 

 The station

Line 1 (Milan Metro) stations
Line 3 (Milan Metro) stations
Railway stations opened in 1964
1964 establishments in Italy
Railway stations in Italy opened in the 20th century